A list of Brazilian telenovelas.

 Água Viva
 Alma Gêmea (Soulmate)
 Alta Estação  (What's Up?)
 América (America)
 Amor e Intrigas  (Love and Conspiracy)
 Anjo Mau (1976), Anjo Mau (1997)  (Evil Angel)
 Antônio Maria
 Aritana
 O Astro (The Illusionist)
 Avenida Brasil (Brazil Avenue)
 Baila Comigo 
 Bandeira Dois (referring to the higher night rate on taxicabs.)
 A Barba Azul 
 Barriga de Aluguel 
 O Beijo do Vampiro
 Beleza Pura (Pure Beauty)
 Belíssima 
 Beto Rockfeller
 O Bem-Amado 
 Bicho do Mato (Savage)
 Chiquititas 
 Cama de Gato (Cat's Cradle)
 Caminhos do Coração  (Ways of the Heart)
 Os Mutantes: Caminhos do Coração  (The Mutants: Ways of the Heart—spin-off from the above)
 Carinhoso
 Carrossel (Carousel)
 A Casa das Sete Mulheres (Seven Women)
 O Casarão 
 Celebridade (Celebrity)
 Chamas da Vida (Flames of Life)
 Chocolate com Pimenta (Pepper Chocolate)
 Cidadão Brasileiro (Scars)
 Ciranda de Pedra 
 O Clone (The Clone)
 Cobras & Lagartos (Snakes & Lizards)
 Coração de Estudante (Students' Hearts)
 O Cravo e a Rosa (The Thorn and the Rose)
 Da Cor do Pecado (Shades of Sin)
 Dance, Dance, Dance
 Dancin' Days
 Desejo Proibido (Forbidden Desire)
 A Deusa Vencida 
 O Direito de Nascer
 O Direito de Nascer
 O Direito de Nascer
 Dona Beija
 Dona Xepa
 Duas Caras (Two Faces)
 Éramos Seis (The Six of Us)
 Escalada
 Escrava Isaura (The Slave Isaura)
 O Espigão 
 Essas Mulheres (These Women)
 Estúpido Cupido 
 Eterna Magia 
 A Favorita (The Favorite)
 Feijão Maravilha 
 Gabriela
 A Gata Comeu 
 Guerra dos Sexos (Fight or Love?)
 Hoje é dia de Maria 
 Ídolo de Pano 
 Os Imigrantes 
 Irmãos Coragem 
 JK (Screen adaptation of the autobiography of Jucelino Kubistchek, Brazilian President from 1956 to 1961)
 Kananga do Japão 
 Laços de Família (Family Ties)
 Locomotivas (A 1970s slang for beautiful woman)
 Luz do Sol (Sunshine)
 Mad Maria
 Minha Doce Namorada 
 As Minas de Prata 
 O Machão 
 Mulheres Apaixonadas (Women in Love)
 Mulheres de Areia (Secrets of the Sand)
 Meu Rico Português 
 A Muralha
 Negócio da China 
 Niña Moza (Little Missy)
 Ninho da Serpente
 Nino, o Italianinho 
 Os Ossos do Barão 
 Páginas da Vida (Pages of Life)
 Pai Herói 
 Paixões Proibidas (Forbidden Passion)
 Pantanal
 Pão pão, Beijo beijo
 Paraíso Tropical (Tropical Paradise)
 Por Amor (Anything for Love)
 O Profeta (The Prophet)
 Prova de Amor (Proof of Love)
 A Próxima Vítima ('The Next Victim)
 Quatro por Quatro 
 Que Rei Sou Eu? 
 Rainha da Sucata 
 O Outro Lado do Paraíso  (The Other Side of Paradise)
 O Rebu (The Party)
 Redenção
 O Rei do Gado (The King of the Cattle)
 Roda de Fogo
 Roque Santeiro
 Sangue do Meu Sangue 
 Saramandaia
 Selva de Pedra 
 Senhora do Destino (Her Own Destiny)
 Sete Pecados (Seven Sins)
 Sinhá Moça (Little Missy)
 Sol de Verão 
 Sonho Meu 
 A Sucessora 
 Terra Nostra 
 Três Irmãs 
 Tieta
 Um Só Coração 
 Vale Tudo 
 Vereda Tropical 
 A Viagem 
 Vidas Opostas (Opposite Lives)
 Xica da Silva
 Caras & Bocas (Watercolours of Love)
 Caminho das Índias (India: a love story)
 Viver a Vida (Seize the day)
 A História de Ester (Esther, The Queen)
 Poder Paralelo (Another Power)
 Uma Rosa com Amor (A Rose with Love)
 Escrito nas Estrelas (Written in the Star)
 Araguaia (Destiny River)
 Ti-Ti-Ti (The Buzz)
 Passione
 Ribeirão do Tempo (River of Intrigues)
 A História de Ana Raio e Zé Trovão
 Insensato coração (Irrational Heart)
 Amor e revolução (Love and Revolution)
 Corações feridos
 Rebelde (Brasil) (Rebel Rio!)

Globo

 Felicidade (1991)
 Vamp (1991–1992)
 Mulheres de Areia (1993)
 Sonho Meu (1993–1994)
 A Viagem (1994)
 Malhação (1995–2020)
 História de Amor (1995–1996)
 O Rei do Gado (1996–1997)
 Anjo de Mim (1996–1997)
 Por Amor (1997–1998)
 Torre de Babel (1998–1999)
 Terra Nostra (1999–2000)
 Laços de Família (2000–2001)
 O Clone (2001–2002)
 Coração de Estudante (2002)
 O Beijo do Vampiro (2002–2003)
 Mulheres Apaixonadas (2003)
 Celebridade (2003–2004)
 Da Cor do Pecado (2004)
 Senhora do Destino (2004–2005)
 América (2005)
 Belíssima (2005–2006)
 Cobras & Lagartos (2006)
 Páginas da Vida (2006–2007)
 Paraíso Tropical (2007)
 A Favorita (2008–2009)
 Tres Irmãs (2008)
 Negócio da China (2008)
 Caminho das Índias (2009)
 Viver a Vida (2010)
 Tempos Modernos (2010)
 Passione (2010–2011)
 Insensato Coração (2011)
 Fina Estampa (2011)

Record

 A Escrava Isaura
 Vidas Opostas
 Amor e Intrigas (2007–present)
 Caminhos do Coração (2007–2008)
 Chamas da Vida
 Máscaras
 Vidas em Jogo
 Bela, a Feia
 Poder Paralelo
 Balacobaco
 Rebelde
 Os Dez Mandamentos

SBT

 Chiquititas
 Éramos Seis
 Esmeralda
 Picara Sonhadora
 Marisol
 Maria Esperança
 Seus Olhos
 Pícara Sonhadora
 Amor e Ódio
 Canavial de Paixões
 Pérola Negra
 Uma Rosa com Amor
 Corações Feridos
 Uma Rosa com Amor
 Amor e Revolução 
 Jamais Te Esquecerei
 Carrossel

References

 
Brazilian